Mini-Micro Systems, a trade magazine, was a computer industry monthly magazine published by Cahners Publishing.

History
The magazine's Mini-Micro Systems title originated in 1976; previously it was named Modern Data. Some of their material was picked up by other computer periodicals. Publication of Mini-Micro ceased in 1989.

When computer periodicals were more numerous, The New York Times noted that the 1968-originated Modern Data title benefited from both a change in title and that they successfully "homed in exclusively on the mushrooming small computer field."

References

  

Defunct computer magazines published in the United States
Professional and trade magazines